The 2015 Kagame Interclub Cup was the 40th edition of the Kagame Interclub Cup, which is organised by CECAFA. It took place in Tanzania from 18 July to 2 August.

All times shown are in East Africa Time (UTC+3).

Broadcasting
South African sports channel SuperSport secured official rights to broadcast all matches played at the tournament, and this year secured a contract to broadcast the cup for the next 4 years.

Participants
The following 13 clubs took part in the competition:

Group A
 Yanga
 Gor Mahia
 Al-Khartoum
 KMKM
 Djibouti Télécom

Group B
 A.P.R.
 Al-Ahly Shendi
 LLB Académic
 Elman

Group C
 Kampala C.C.A.
 Azam
 Al-Malakia
 Adama City

Group stage
 
The group stage featured thirteen teams, with 5 teams in Group A and 4 teams in Group B and C. Three teams from Group A and B and two teams from Group C advanced to the knockout stage.

Group A

Group B

Group C

Knockout stage
In the knockout stage, teams played against each other once. The losers of the semi-finals played against each other in a third place playoff where the winner was placed third overall in the entire competition.

Bracket

Quarter-finals

Semi-finals

Third place play-off

Final

Top scorers

References

Kagame Interclub Cup
Kagame Interclub Cup
2015 in Tanzanian sport
International association football competitions hosted by Tanzania